Susan Chitabanta (born 1953) is a Zambian novelist and short story writer.  She was the first woman novelist published by the Kenneth Kaunda Foundation.

Works
 Behind the Closed Door (1992)  226 pp
 Ombela umo ombela (2002)  (short story) (Bemba) Lusaka : Zambia Women Writers' Association  63 pp.
 A Lie to a Liar (1997) 
Published in The heart of a woman: Short stories from Zambia

References

Living people
1953 births
Zambian novelists
Zambian women short story writers
21st-century Zambian writers
21st-century Zambian women writers
20th-century Zambian writers
20th-century Zambian women writers